The motor size constant and motor velocity constant (alternatively called the back EMF constant) are values used to describe characteristics of electrical motors.

Motor constant

 is the motor constant (sometimes, motor size constant). In SI units, the motor constant is expressed in newton metres per square root watt:
 
 	
where
  is the motor torque (SI unit: newton–metre)	
  is the resistive power loss (SI unit: watt)
 	
The motor constant is winding independent (as long as the same conductive material is used for wires); e.g., winding a motor with 6 turns with 2 parallel wires instead of 12 turns single wire will double the velocity constant, but  remains unchanged.  can be used for selecting the size of a motor to use in an application.  can be used for selecting the winding to use in the motor.

Since the torque  is current  multiplied by  then  becomes 
 

where
  is the current (SI unit, ampere)	
  is the resistance (SI unit, ohm)
  is the motor torque constant (SI unit, newton–metre per ampere, N·m/A), see below

Alternatively, the system could run at the same torque as before, with torque and current split equally across the two motors, which halves the resistive losses.

Motor velocity constant, back EMF constant 

 is the motor velocity, or motor speed, constant (not to be confused with kV, the symbol for kilovolt), measured in revolutions per minute (RPM) per volt or radians per volt second, rad/V·s:
 

The  rating of a brushless motor is the ratio of the motor's unloaded rotational speed (measured in RPM) to the peak (not RMS) voltage on the wires connected to the coils (the back EMF). For example, an unloaded motor of  supplied with 11.1 V will run at a nominal speed of 63,270 rpm (= 5,700 rpm/V × 11.1 V).

The motor may not reach this theoretical speed because there are non-linear mechanical losses.

The terms ,  are also used, as are the terms back EMF constant, or the generic electrical constant. Sometimes it is expressed in non SI units volts per kilorevolution per minute (V/krpm).
 

The field flux may also be integrated into the formula:
 

By Lenz's law, a running motor generates a back-EMF proportional to the speed. Once the motor's rotational velocity is such that the back-EMF is equal to the battery voltage (also called DC line voltage), the motor reaches its limit speed.

Motor torque constant 
 is the torque produced divided by armature current. It can be calculated from the motor velocity constant .
 

where  is the armature current of the machine (SI unit: ampere).  is primarily used to calculate the armature current for a given torque demand: 
 

The SI units for the torque constant are newton meters per ampere (N·m/A). Since 1 N·m = 1 J, and 1 A = 1 C/s, then 1 N·m/A = 1 J·s/C = 1 V·s (same units as back EMF constant).

An analogy with a hypothetical linear motor can help to convince that it is true. Conversely,  ( is speed of the linear motor,  is voltage).

To translate this model to a rotating motor, one can simply attribute an arbitrary diameter to the motor armature e.g. 2 m and assume for simplicity that all force is applied at the outer perimeter of the rotor, giving 1 m of leverage.

Now, supposing that  (angular speed per unit voltage) of the motor is 3600 rpm/V, it can be translated to "linear" by multiplying by 2π m (the perimeter of the rotor) and dividing by 60, since angular speed is per minute. This is linear .

Now, if this motor is fed with current of 2 A and assuming that back-EMF is exactly 2 V, it is rotating at 7200 rpm and the mechanical power is 4 W, and the force on rotor is  N or 0.0053 N. The torque on shaft is 0.0053 N⋅m at 2 A because of the assumed radius of the rotor (exactly 1 m). Assuming a different radius would change the linear  but would not change the final torque result. To check the result, remember that .

So, a motor with  will generate 0.00265 N⋅m of torque per ampere of current, regardless of its size or other characteristics. This is exactly the value estimated by the  formula stated earlier.

References

External links

Electric motors